William Pratt (fl. 1589) was an English politician.

He was a Member (MP) of the Parliament of England for Southwark in 1589.

References

Year of birth missing
Year of death missing
English MPs 1589